Cashier balancing is a process usually conducted in businesses such as grocery stores, restaurants and banks that takes place at the closing of the business day or at the end of a cashier's shift. This balancing process makes the cashier responsible for the money in their cash register.

The Balancing Process  
Note that the balancing procedure may vary drastically from store to store; however, the closing contents of the cash drawer must match (within a certain allowed variance) the number expected on the X-report or Z-report, or "Cashier Closeoff" or "Signoff Report" generated by the cash register. Deposit rules will vary; most modern retailers will deposit only larger bills and not deposit smaller bills or coins but will leave them in the cash drawer to be used as change. In many retailers, the "starting amount" or "float" will fluctuate from shift to shift depending on the number of coins or small bills left in the till. In some retail establishments, credit or debit chits will be added like cash to the total contents of the cash drawer. However, the following applies as a general principle. 

In order to balance (or settle) the cash drawer, first, the manager (or sometimes the cashier) prepares to count the money in the register. Counting the money is usually done in the back office: the drawer is removed from the register and taken into the office. By preparing to count the money, all large bills, checks and coupons and food stamps (if any) are removed and put to the side. Next, the person counting the money counts it back to its "starting amount." The starting amount is the amount of money that was in the drawer at the beginning of the shift. As this is being done, there will be additional bills and change that will be put off to the side along with the larger bills. Once the drawer is reset back to its starting amount for the next cashier's shift, it is either placed in the safe or given to another cashier that is starting their shift.

Deposits During Shift  
Depending on the store's policies and procedures, "drops" or "pickups" or "deposits" may happen in mid-shift if the Cashier or the Manager sees there is too much cash in the cashier's drawer. This is to limit the risk of a robbery and to make the store a less desirable target. 

Cash Back on debit transactions is a similar concept to a deposit as the cash in the drawer is replaced by money directly placed into the store's bank account and offers the customer the advantage of not having to make a separate transaction at an ATM. In this way, Cash Back is generally beneficial to both the customer and the retailer, and offers the customer the ability request change or other denominations not generally available from ATMs. 

Some POS systems will prompt the cashier to make a deposit. Procedures will vary from retailer to retailer, but in general the large bills are removed from the till and are either manually counted by the cashier or by a manager and are "dropped" into an inaccessible safe. The deposit will be recorded in the cashier's POS and will therefore no longer be expected in the cashier's drawer at the end of his or her shift, but will remain part of the final accountability at the end of the cashier's shift.

Cashier Accountability  
Now, the bills and change that were put off to the side get counted, along with the checks from the cashier's drawer. This is what makes up the cashier's sales deposit. Most cash registers can print up a sales slip and money tendering slip that tells how much money the cashier made in sales and how much money the cashier is accounted for. The manager refers to this slip when counting the cashier's sales money. If the money counted does not match what is on the balancing slip, the cashier may be over or short (in cash). Whenever a discrepancy such as overages or shortages occur, the money is usually counted again to ensure that the amount is correct. The over/short can always be calculated by subtracting the amount of money in the drawer (exclude the "starting amount") from the amount printed on the cashier tendering slip, or balancing slip. 

Depending on the amount of over/short and circumstances involved, disciplinary actions may vary. Cashiers often lose their jobs to cash overages/shortages, either for repeated violations or for large overages or shortages. In most establishments, termination on the first offense is usually for $100.00 over/short or more, and can result in criminal charges against the cashier. 

Shortages usually result from bills sticking together or from the cashier giving back too much change, or maybe even "pocketing" some money from the register. "Quick Change" scams are common, as a dishonest customer attempts to defraud a cashier by saying verbally, "And I'll pay with a $50" but only passing the cashier a smaller bill hoping the cashier will provide change as for a larger bill, or doing other things to attempt to confuse the cashier. In any instance of an unusual transaction, the cashier should print and save a duplicate receipt in order that the store's Loss Prevention may investigate the transaction should the till not balance. 

Overages occur from taking too much money from customers, not entering the tender correctly other otherwise issuing incorrect change, or not entering items in the point of sale terminal properly. 

Honesty and accuracy are paramount.

Over/Short 
Cash overages/shortages are usually expressed in several ways. This example shows how it is expressed in writing and how a register printout would show them.

Overage $12.34: is written as +12.34; is printed out as: $12.34 or +$12.34.

Shortage $12.34 is written as: -12.34; is printed out as: ($12.34) or -$12.34.

References 

Corporate finance